The 5th Golden Globe Awards, honoring the best achievements in 1947 filmmaking, were held on 10 March 1948 at the Hollywood Roosevelt Hotel in Los Angeles, California.

Winners

Best Picture 
 Gentleman's Agreement directed by Elia Kazan

Best Actor in a Leading Role 
 Ronald Colman - A Double Life

Best Actress in a Leading Role 
 Rosalind Russell - Mourning Becomes Electra

Best Performance by an Actor in a Supporting Role in a Motion Picture 
 Edmund Gwenn - Miracle on 34th Street

Best Performance by an Actress in a Supporting Role in a Motion Picture 
 Celeste Holm - Gentleman's Agreement

Best Director-Motion Picture 
 Elia Kazan - Gentleman's Agreement

Best Screenplay
 Miracle on 34th Street written by George Seaton

Best Music, Original Score - Motion Picture
 Life with Father composed by Max Steiner

Cinematography
 Black Narcissus photographed by Jack Cardiff

Most Promising Newcomer - Male
 Richard Widmark in Kiss of Death

Most Promising Newcomer - Female
 Lois Maxwell in That Hagen Girl

Special Award - Best Juvenile Actor
 Dean Stockwell in Gentleman's Agreement

Special Achievement Award 
 Walt Disney for Bambi (Hindustani Version) Furthering The Influence Of The Screen

See also
 Hollywood Foreign Press Association
 1st British Academy Film Awards
 2nd Cannes Film Festival
 20th Academy Awards
 1947 in film

References

005
1947 film awards
1947 television awards
March 1948 events in the United States